

Seattle Lutheran High School is a Lutheran high school located in the West Seattle neighborhood of Seattle, Washington. Founded in 1978, Seattle Lutheran enrolls about 70 students.

On April 22, 2022 it was announced that Seattle Lutheran would be closing at the end of the 2021-2022 school year.

Sports
The school offers seasonal sports at the varsity, and when applicable, the junior varsity, and 'C-team' level. SLHS competes in the Seatac 1B League. Men's basketball fills the winter season, and spring sports include baseball, golf, and track and field. Cheerleading is offered during the fall and winter seasons.

The baseball team won the Washington State Championship in 2010 and 2011.

The Women's Soccer team won the State 2B title in 2010.

Seattle Lutheran has participated in FIRST Robotics competitions since 2004 as Team 1258 "Seabot", making it one of the oldest FIRST teams in the region. In 2022 the Team 1258 was the victor of the PNW District Bonney Lake Event and the PNW District Auburn Event.

References

External links
 Seattle Lutheran High School website

High schools in King County, Washington
Schools in Seattle
Lutheran schools in Washington (state)
Private high schools in Washington (state)
West Seattle, Seattle